The Lone Star Brewery, built in 1884, was the first large mechanized brewery in Texas. Adolphus Busch, of Anheuser-Busch, founded it along with a group of San Antonio businessmen. The castle-like building which was once its brewery now houses the San Antonio Museum of Art. Lone Star beer was the company's main brand. The beer is still marketed as "The National Beer of Texas." The Lone Star name is now owned by Pabst Brewing Company. Production of Lone Star is currently contracted out to Miller Brewing Company in Fort Worth. The Lone Star name is used in the Philippines under license to Asia Brewery for a brand of light beer.

History
It was made in San Marcos before the Alamo Brewing Company of San Antonio in 1874, the company was purchased by Anheuser-Busch in 1895 at which time it was housed in the Old Lone Star Brewery located on 200 West Jones Avenue. The original Lone Star Bottling Works opened in San Antonio in the 1890s and by 1903 was selling 65,000 barrels of beer annually.

With the end of Prohibition in 1933, a new brewery under the name Sabinas Brewing Company was constructed at 600 Lone Star Boulevard and operated under the Sabinas name until 1939.  The company then operated under name to the Champion Brewing Company until 1940, at which time it was purchased by the Muchlebach Brewing Company of Kansas City, Missouri.  The company re-branded itself as the Lone Star Brewing Company and began officially producing Lone Star Beer that year. The brewery also produced Lone Star Light, low-calorie Lime Lager (1970), and Brut Super Premium (1969).

It was not until 1940 that brewer Peter Kreil from Munich created the formula for the first beer to actually be called Lone Star beer. In 1949, under the leadership of Harry Jersig, Lone Star went public. By 1960, the brewery had 651 employees and by 1965, annual sales exceeded 1 million barrels.

Olympia Brewing Co. of Washington bought Lone Star in 1976, and it changed hands again in 1983 when Wisconsin's G. Heileman bought Olympia.

Detroit-based Stroh Brewery Co. then bought Heileman and closed the San Antonio brewery in 1996 moving beer production to Longview, Texas and signaling the end of San Antonio as a major brewing town. Milwaukee-based Pabst bought most of the Stroh brands, including Lone Star, in 1999, and began brewing Lone Star at the San Antonio Pearl Brewery to great fanfare. In 2000, the Pearl Brewery was closed because it was outdated and would have been too expensive to continue to operate or to bring up to date. Production of Lone Star is currently contracted out to non-Pabst owned breweries (e.g. Miller Brewing Company in Fort Worth).

In 1956, the Lone Star Brewery purchased the Buckhorn Saloon & Museum collection. Harry Jersig, President of the brewery and a friend of the Friedrich’s, continued to add to the collection and had a special building erected on the Lone Star grounds to house the collection.

In the 1970s, Lone Star's sales benefited from Jerry Retzloff, former marketing and promotions manager for Lone Star Beer and his close association with Willie Nelson, the Austin music scene and their Giant Armadillo.  The beer is mentioned frequently in the title track of Red Steagall's 1976 album "Lone Star Beer and Bob Wills Music".  In 1999, the company began to sponsor Texas singers and musicians, such as Two Tons of Steel, with the beer's "It's a Texas Thing" advertising campaign. 
 
In the 1990s, Lone Star introduced Lone Star Ice and Lone Star Dry for a short period of time.

In popular culture

Television
 Due to similarities, it is believed that Alamo Beer pictured in the television series King of the Hill is a winking tribute to Lone Star.
 In Series 2, Episode 2 of the UK TV series Skins, Michelle wears a shirt with the company's logo.
 J. R. Ewing is seen at a bar with a bottle of Lone Star in season 12, episode 20 (originally aired March 31, 1989), of Dallas.
 Lone Star Beer was the underwriter for the PBS music program Austin City Limits from 1976 to 1983 (seasons 1-8).
 It is also featured in the first episode of the third season, and eighteenth episode of the seventh season of The Big Bang Theory.
 Lone Star Beer is the favorite beer of George Cooper Sr. (played by Lance Barber), in Young Sheldon, the spin-off program from The Big Bang Theory that premiered in 2017.
 Detective Rust Cohle, played by Matthew McConaughey, drinks a six pack during his interview in True Detective. The beer can also be seen numerous times throughout the first season.
 Carter and her friends are seen drinking Lone Star Beer in the third episode of Finding Carter.
 This beer is also presented in almost every bar scene of the sixth season of The Mentalist.
 It is the beer of choice for Tim Riggins in NBC's Friday Night Lights.
 One of the beers of choice of horror host Joe Bob Briggs in many of his shows.

Theatre
 Lone Star Beer is a central theme of the one-act play Lone Star by James McLure.

Film
 Lone Star Beer is featured prominently in the Houston-based film Urban Cowboy of 1980.
 The beer is featured in the diner scene of the 1982 film, Six Pack.
 The beer is also shown in the movie ‘Deep Impact’ in the barscene when the crew of the Messias are having drinks
 In the 2014 biographic film American Sniper, Chris Kyle and his brother are shown drinking LoneStar and a case of the beer is shown next to the TV.
 In the 2016 film Everybody Wants Some!!, Lone Star Beer is referenced and regularly seen.
 drank throughout the 2021 film “cold in July”
 Lone Star Beer is also seen in the 2018 film "Galveston" starring Ben Foster.

Music
 Actor and country singer-songwriter-actor Christian Kane references Lone Star Beer in his song "American Made".
 Country singer Whitey Morgan references Lone Star Beer in his 2009 song "Buick City".
 The Charlie Daniels Band references Lone Star Beer in their song "Texas".
 The song "Amarillo Highway" (performed by Robert Earl Keen, among others) makes reference to a "trunk full of Pearl beer and Lone Star." 
 Ed and Patsy Bruce's 1975 song "Mamas, Don't Let Your Babies Grow Up to Be Cowboys" (a tune made famous by Waylon Jennings and Willie Nelson) references "Lone Star belt-buckles and ol' faded Levi's" as appurtenances.
 Country music singer-songwriter Pat Green references Lone Star beer in his song "Here We Go", singing, "There's Lone Star beer in my cereal..."
 The beer is referenced in the Johnny Paycheck song "11 months and 29 days"; the lyrics go as follows: "Keep the Lone Star cold, the dance floor hot while I'm gone".
 Waylon Jennings almost exclusively drank Lone Star Beer.
Dale Watson, Texas "Ameripolitan" singer, drinks Lone Star Beer almost exclusively and plugs the beer during his concerts.

Images

See also
 List of defunct breweries in the United States

References

External links

Lone Star Beer - Lone Star's Official Site
Pabst Brewing Company - Current owner of the Lone Star brands.
1958 Brewery tour
The ruins of Lone Star's second brewery
Photos of Lone Star Hall of Horns circa 1996
Solutions to Puzzle Caps
The Lone Star Brewery B. Knightly Development and Construction's website for revitalization of the second brewery.
The Beer That Made Armadillos Famous
Lone Star Beer Ad made by the Jamieson Film Company

American beer brands
Companies based in DuPage County, Illinois
History of Olympia, Washington
Pabst Brewing Company
Defunct brewery companies of the United States
Woodridge, Illinois
Food and drink companies established in 1884
1884 establishments in Texas
Defunct manufacturing companies based in Texas